Marko Bašić may refer to:

Marko Bašić (footballer, born 1984), Croatian footballer for HNK Šibenik
Marko Bašić (footballer, born 1988), Croatian footballer for Grasshopper Club Zürich